Wigle may refer to:

People
Solomon Wigle (1822–1898), Ontario businessman and politician
Lewis Wigle (1845–1934), Ontario farmer, businessman and politician; son of Solomon Wigle
Lambert Peter Wigle (1867–1941), Ontario farmer and politician
Ernest S. Wigle  (1859–1947), Ontario lawyer and politician
Thomas W. Wigle (1909–1944), American World War II veteran and Medal of Honor recipient
Wigle Aytta van Zwichem (1507–1577), Dutch statesman and jurist

Other
WiGLE, Wireless Geographic Logging Engine, a website for user aggregation of data about wireless networks worldwide
Wigle Whiskey, a distillery in Pittsburgh, Pennsylvania